Hudson is an off-island suburb of Montreal, with a population of 5,135 (2011 Census). It is located on the south-west bank of the lower Ottawa River, in Vaudreuil-Soulanges Regional County Municipality.

Hudson is a municipality within Greater Montreal.  An informal rural agglomeration since the early part of the 19th century, the Town of Hudson was formally created in June 1969 by merging the villages of Hudson, Hudson Heights and Como. A relatively wealthy town, Hudson is known for its large, turn-of-the century houses, many of which border the Lake of Two Mountains. A ferry from Hudson takes cars across the lake (a widening of the Ottawa River) to the village of Oka.

Hudson has been compared to culturally and demographically similar Quebec towns such as the Eastern Townships villages of  North Hatley and  Brome Lake as well as nearby Senneville. All four municipalities border a body of water (used extensively for recreation year-round) and include a blend of French and English residents.

Geography 

Hudson is near the edge of suburban Montreal to the east, but also surrounded by substantial farming and forest areas to the west.  Large lot sizes, enforced by town bylaws, contribute to the relatively large number of trees in the residential areas. Zoning, infrastructure and building development are occasionally controversial subjects, such as when town residents voted against permitting Gheorghe Zamfir to build a concert hall near the edge of town in the 1980s.  In 2001, the town won a victory in Canada's Supreme Court, upholding its by-law 207, which bans pesticide use on public and private property for cosmetic (purely aesthetic) purposes.

The municipal territory of Hudson is delimited as follows:
 with the limit of Saint-Placide;
 with the limit of Oka;
 with the limit of Vaudreuil-Dorion;
 with the limit of Rigaud.

Physical environment
The bedrock under Hudson is Cambrian Period sandstone. This is overlain by marine clay or stony sandy loam glacial till. On the surface are sands which were deposited by air or water. Most of Hudson is built on the Ste-Sophie loamy fine sand, which is well drained and drought-prone despite its clay base; undisturbed areas have classic podzol development. Several blocks away from the river the sands become deeper, coarser and even more xeric; they are mapped as Upland sand which is also a podzol.

History
The local post office opened in 1841, originally named Pointe-à-Cavagnol. In 1845, a glass factory was established there by George Matthews, whose wife was called Elisa Hudson. Her name was adopted by the post office in 1865.

In 1877, the Village Municipality of Como was formed when it separated from Vaudreuil. This village was named after Lake Como in Italy due to its scenic location on Lake of Two Mountains. It was renamed to Hudson in 1921.

4 years later, in 1925, the new Village Municipality of McNaughton was split off from Hudson. The following year, Hudson was renamed to Hudson Heights, and McNaughton took the name Hudson.

In June 1969, the Town of Hudson was formed by amalgamating the village municipalities of Hudson, Hudson Heights, and Como (which was originally formed as Como-Est in 1918).

Pesticide Ban
The town gained notoriety in 1991 by becoming the first in Quebec, Canada to ban several forms of lawn and garden pesticides used to kill insects and weeds. The town was sued by two pesticide companies and on June 28, 2001, the Supreme Court of Canada ruled in the town's favour. The Hudson example spurred many other municipalities and provinces in Canada to enact similar bans of pesticides. The Hudson case is the subject of a 2009 American documentary movie titled A Chemical Reaction by filmmaker Brett Plymale.

Demographics 

Unlike the surrounding mainly French-speaking municipalities, Hudson has a predominantly English-speaking population (65% according to the 2011 Census), although many residents speak both languages.

Events and tourist attractions 

Tourist attractions of Hudson include:
 Artistes Hudson Artists, Quebec's oldest continuing English language art club
 Hudson & Region Studio Tour
 The Hudson Players Club, Quebec's oldest continually operating theatre company, English or French, professional or amateur
 The Village Theatre (located in the historical train station)
 The Hudson Film Society
 Greenwood Centre for Living History
 St. James', St. Mary's, Wyman Memorial United and St. Thomas Aquinas churches
 Chateau du Lac (bar in a historic building, closed 2020)
 The Hudson Music Fest

Notable annual events in Hudson include the Hudson Street Fair, the Hudson Yacht Club Labour Day Regatta, the FruitBowl Regatta (North America's most well-attended youth sailing event), Canada Day festivities, Shiver Fest (a winter carnival), the Turn on the Lights Festival, the Hudson & Region Studio Tour, the Home & Gardens Tour, the Hudson Festival of Canadian Film, the Santa Claus Parade and (as of 2010) the St. Patrick's Day Parade.

Hudson Yacht Club
The Hudson Yacht Club (HYC) is a boating and social club founded in 1909 on the shores of Lake of Two Mountains (Lac des Deux Montagnes). The club annually hosts the "FruitBowl" regatta for young sailors and the Labour Day Regatta for its general membership and visitors.  The HYC has published two retrospectives: Hudson Yacht Club: Seventy-Fifth Anniversary Year in 1984 and Our Spirit Lives On: A Celebration of Hudson Yacht Club's First 100 Years, 1909-2009 in 2009.

Government

Municipal council
The Quebec Cities and Towns Act requires all towns the size of Hudson to have a municipal council of six councillors and one mayor, elected by the local population every four years.  The mayor is elected by all Hudson residents, while the town is divided into six wards to elect the councillors.  Given the small size of the town, council seats are often won by acclamation.  Council meets once per month in the Stephen Shaar Community Centre, named after the mayor who served until 2004 (and presided over its construction).  Municipal administrators work in the Town Hall.  Town council is responsible for things such as water supply, local road maintenance, zoning, construction permits, and administration of parks.  Some responsibilities, such as regional planning, is shared with the county.   Council receives its revenues through property taxes, which it establishes. The town maintains its own volunteer fire department and a local patrol to enforce municipal by-laws.

Former mayors
List of former mayors:
 George N. Armstrong (1969–1973)
 Job Taylor Bradbury (1973–1989)
 Gilbert Michael Elliott (1989–1993, 2009–2013)
 Stephen F. Shaar (1993–2004)
 Elizabeth Corker (2004–2009)
 Diane Paciente (interim mayor 2013)
 Ed Prévost (2013–2017)
 Jamie Nicholls (2017–2021)
 Chloe Hutchison (2021–present)

Infrastructure

Transportation
A single street, Main Road, traverses Hudson east to west, while the southern border of the town mainly runs along Quebec Route 342 (also known as Boulevard Harwood).  Although many residents commute by automobile, a commuter train to Montreal (Vaudreuil-Hudson Line) stops in Hudson once per weekday in either direction.

The town is also served by the 21 bus from the Exo La Presqu'Île, terminating at the Vaudreuil train station.

Ferry to Oka

Since 1909, a ferry across the Lake of Two Mountains has run from Hudson to Oka during the spring, summer and fall. Ferries are self-propelled and take ten to fifteen minutes to carry multiple automobiles, bike passengers, and foot passengers for a fee. Prior to the change to self-propelled ferries, a system of barges were towed across the lake by ropes attached to diesel powered tugboats.

During the winter months, a tolled ice bridge allows vehicular traffic between the two towns.

Water and sewage
Hudson has a municipal water and sewage system.  The sewage system was built in the first decade of the 21st century and serves the central area of town.  It is relatively common for houses outside the central area to use well water and/or a septic tank.

Municipal facilities

The town operates the Stephen Shaar Community Centre, teen centre (in the lower level of the community centre) and a municipal outdoor swimming pool.  The town also has a number of parks, including St. Thomas Park (soccer fields behind the swimming pool), Thompson park (lakeside soccer fields), Benson Park (with a softball field, children's playground with outdoor hockey and skating rinks), Jack Layton Park (trails to Sandy Beach, picnic area and public boat launch) and Sandy Beach.

Education
The town has three schools, of which two are English (Mount Pleasant Elementary School & Westwood Senior, formerly Hudson High School) and one French (St-Thomas Elementary School), as well as six  churches: one Baptist (Hudson Community Baptist Church ), one Catholic (St-Thomas Aquinas), two Anglican (St-James & St-Mary's), one United (Wyman), and one Reformed Presbyterian Church of North America (Hudson-Saint-Lazare)

Commission Scolaire des Trois-Lacs operates Francophone schools.
 École Saint-Thomas

Lester B. Pearson School Board operates Anglophone schools.
 Mount Pleasant Elementary School
 Westwood Senior Campus

Notable people 

 Jack Layton, former leader of the New Democratic Party
 Patrick Watson, musician, best known for 2007 single "The great escape"
 Paul Frappier was a Montreal-based Canadian entertainer, musician, and hip hop MC of Haitian origin, better known by his stage name Bad News Brown.
 Jean-Paul L'Allier, former mayor of Quebec City
 Vanessa Lengies, actress, best known for "Are you afraid of the dark", "Popular Mechanics For Kids", American Dreams and Glee,
 Matthew Lombardi, NHL hockey player for the Toronto Maple Leafs (formerly Calgary Flames, Phoenix Coyotes, Nashville Predators)
 A.M. Pattison, artist, commercial artist and architect
 Daniel Shelton, comic artist, for syndicated comic strip Ben.
 Larry Smith, former Canadian Football League Commissioner and current Conservative Senator
 Amanda Walsh, best known for being a MuchMusic VJ (2000–2004), as well as her role in film 'Ghosts of Girlfriends Past' (2009), and recurring roles in 'Sons & Daughters' and 'The Big Bang Theory'
 Sam Goldberg Jr., musician, best known as member of Broken Social Scene
 Lorne Elliott, comedian, musician and former presenter for CBC Radio
 P.J. Stock, former NHL hockey player for the New York Rangers, Montreal Canadiens, Philadelphia Flyers and Boston Bruins and current commentator on French-Canadian sports channel RDS

See also
 List of cities in Quebec

References

External links 

 Town of Hudson official site
 Quebec Cities and Towns Act
 The Hudson Historical Society
 Greenwood Centre for Living History
 Hudson Yacht Club
 Annual Hudson Street Fair
 Hudson&Region Studio Tour

Cities and towns in Quebec
Incorporated places in Vaudreuil-Soulanges Regional County Municipality